Orchard Hill is a town in Spalding County, Georgia, United States. The population was 230 at the 2000 census.

History
Orchard Hill was named for the setting of the original town site. The Georgia General Assembly incorporated Orchard Hill as a town in 1912.

Geography
Orchard Hill is located at  (33.186853, -84.211379).

Demographics

As of the census of 2000, there were 230 people, 89 households, and 70 families residing in the town. The racial makeup of the town was 96.52% White, 1.30% African American, 2.17% from other races. Hispanic or Latino of any race were 2.17% of the population.

There were 89 households, out of which 37.1% had children under the age of 18 living with them, 59.6% were married couples living together, 14.6% had a female householder with no husband present, and 21.3% were non-families. 16.9% of all households were made up of individuals, and 4.5% had someone living alone who was 65 years of age or older.  The average household size was 2.58 and the average family size was 2.91.

In the town, the population was spread out, with 25.7% under the age of 18, 14.8% from 18 to 24, 24.3% from 25 to 44, 28.7% from 45 to 64, and 6.5% who were 65 years of age or older.  The median age was 33 years. For every 100 females, there were 84.0 males.  For every 100 females age 18 and over, there were 83.9 males.

The median income for a household in the town was $31,429, and the median income for a family was $37,500. Males had a median income of $30,481 versus $17,500 for females. The per capita income for the town was $14,215.  About 7.1% of families and 9.0% of the population were below the poverty line, including none of those under the age of eighteen and 21.4% of those 65 or over.

See also

 List of municipalities in Georgia (U.S. state)

References

External links

Towns in Spalding County, Georgia
Towns in Georgia (U.S. state)